Yakob Debesay (born 28 June 1999) is a former Eritrean road cyclist, who last rode for UCI ProTeam .

Personal life
Debesay comes from a cycling family; his brothers Ferekalsi Debesay and Mekseb Debesay, as well as his sister Mossana Debesai are also cyclists.

Major results
2017
 1st  Time trial, National Junior Road Championships
2018
 4th Overall Tour of Fuzhou
2019
 1st  Overall Tour de l'Espoir
1st Stages 1 (TTT) & 3
 7th Overall Tour du Rwanda
1st  Mountains classification
1st  Young rider classification
1st Stage 7
2020
 3rd Piccolo Giro di Lombardia

References

External links

1999 births
Living people
Eritrean male cyclists
Sportspeople from Asmara